Jabłonkowanie or siakanie is a regional phonological feature of the Polish language. It consists of the merger of the series of retroflex sibilants   and palatal sibilants   into a phonetically-intermediate series  (sometimes written ).

It occurs in a number of other Polish subdialects. 

References

Sound changes
Slavic phonologies
Polish dialects